Audrey Prieto (born 13 June 1980) is a female freestyle wrestler from France. She participated in Women's freestyle wrestling 72 kg at 2008 Summer Olympics. Prieto lost in the 1/8 of final to Anita Schätzle.

References

External links
 

Living people
1980 births
French female sport wrestlers
Olympic wrestlers of France
Wrestlers at the 2008 Summer Olympics
World Wrestling Championships medalists
Sportspeople from Clermont-Ferrand
Mediterranean Games bronze medalists for France
Competitors at the 2005 Mediterranean Games
Mediterranean Games medalists in wrestling
21st-century French women